The Embassy of Ireland is Ireland's embassy in Canada. It is located at 130 Albert Street in the 11th Floor, in the city's downtown core of Ottawa, Ontario, Canada.

Dr. Eamonn C. McKee has served as Ambassador since October 2020.

Ireland has a consulate-general in Vancouver and honorary consulates in Calgary, Edmonton, Montreal and St. John's.

Ambassador's residence
The Irish Ambassador's official residence in Canada is located at 291 Park Road in Ottawa's upscale Rockcliffe Park neighborhood.

See also
List of ambassadors of Ireland to Canada

References

External links
 , Department of Foreign Affairs and International Trade (Canada), August 2007
 Embassy of Ireland in Canada

Ireland
Ottawa
Canada–Ireland relations
Ambassadors of Ireland to Canada
High Commissioners of Ireland to Canada
Ireland and the Commonwealth of Nations